The Trois-Rivières City Council (in French: Conseil municipal de Trois-Rivières) is the governing body for the mayor–council government in the city of Trois-Rivières, in the Mauricie region of Quebec, Canada.

Mayor
Yves Lévesque (2001–2019)
Jean Lamarche (2019-present; elected in a by-election on May 5)

Councillors
As of the 2017 Quebec municipal elections
District 1, Du Carmel
Pierre Montreuil
District 2, Des Carrefours
Valérie Renaud-Martin
District 3, De Châteaudun
Luc Tremblay
District 4, De Chavigny
Maryse Bellemare
District 5, Des Estacades
Pierre-Luc Fortin
District 6, Des Forges
Mariannick Mercure
District 7, De La Vérendrye
Dany Carpentier
District 8, De La Madeleine
Sabrina Roy
District 9, De Marie-de-l'Incarnation
Denis Roy
District 10, De Pointe-du-Lac
François Bélisle
District 11, De Richelieu
Ginette Bellemare
District 12, Des Rivières
Claude Ferron
District 13, De Sainte-Marthe
Daniel Cournoyer
District 14, De Saint-Louis-de-France
Michel Cormier

See also
List of mayors of Trois-Rivières

External links
Official site of councilor Yves Landry 
City Council page on the Yves Landry site 
Official Trois-Rivières municipal site 

Municipal councils in Quebec
Politics of Trois-Rivières